The House of Božidarević or House de Bosdari (in Italian) is a noble family (patrician) of the city of Dubrovnik, dating from the Republic of Ragusa and Ancona, Italy.

History
In 1450 the Bosdari family participated in the defense of Habsburg Croatia against the Ottoman Empire. They belonged to the list of late patriciate families of the Ragusan nobility. Biagio de Bosdari (*c.1635), son of Michele de Bosdari, was admitted to the council of Dubrovnik on 5 November 1666, who contributed with 5,000 ducats to the Republic treasury. On 30 July 1667 Božidar de Bosdari was admitted to the council of Ragusa as a token of gratitude for community service in the period after the earthquake.

Bosdari of Ancona
The brother of Vlaho, Frano, moved to Ancona, founding the Ancona branch of the family with the name Bosdari. An Imperial Diploma of 4 July 1753 created the Bosdari of Ancona nobles. The family later moved to Bologna.

See also 
Republic of Ragusa
Dubrovnik
Dalmatia
Post-Roman patriciates

Sources 
Historical Encyclopedia Nobiliare, Milan 1929, vol. II, pp. 152-153

Ragusan noble families